Byram Green (April 15, 1786 – October 18, 1865) was a New York state legislator for years in the Assembly and Senate, from 1816 to 1824.  In 1842, he was elected United States Representative from New York and served one term from 1843 to 1845.

Early life and education
Born in East Windsor, Berkshire County, Massachusetts, Green attended the public schools.

He earned a degree from Williams College in 1808. There in the summer of 1806, Green was among the five participants in the Haystack Prayer Meeting.  Within a few years, those men launched the American missionary movement.

Green was later instrumental in having a monument created to honor that meeting and movement. It was placed at Mission Park at Williams College.

Career
Green became a professor in a college at Beaufort, South Carolina in 1810.  He went on to study ("read") law with practitioners, in the tradition of the day, and was admitted to the bar.  He began to practice law.

He went to New York, where he settled in Sodus. During the War of 1812, he fought in the Battle of Sodus Point.

In 1816 Green was first elected to the New York State Assembly, where he served until 1822, upon re-election. After that, he was elected to the New York State Senate in 1823 and 1824.

Congress 
Green was elected as a Democrat from New York's 27th congressional district in the Twenty-eighth Congress.  He held office from March 4, 1843 to March 3, 1845.

Death 
He died in Sodus, New York in 1865; interment was in the Sodus Rural Cemetery.

References

1786 births
1865 deaths
People from Berkshire County, Massachusetts
People from Sodus, New York
Williams College alumni
New York (state) state court judges
Democratic Party members of the New York State Assembly
Democratic Party New York (state) state senators
Democratic Party members of the United States House of Representatives from New York (state)
19th-century American politicians
19th-century American judges